Idir-e Sofla (also Romanized as Īdīr-e Soflá; also known as Īder, Īder Soflá, Īdīr-e Pā'īn, Igdir, and Īkdīr) is a village in Aslan Duz Rural District, Aslan Duz District, Parsabad County, Ardabil Province, Iran. At the 2006 census, its population was 61 people from 11 families. The village is populated by the Kurdish Chalabianlu tribe.

References 

Towns and villages in Parsabad County
Kurdish settlements in East Azerbaijan Province